E.G. Crazy (stylized as E.G. CRAZY) is a double album by Japanese musical unit E-girls, which also serves as their fourth studio release. It was distributed on January 3, 2016 for streaming through Japan's AWA services, and released on January 18, 2017 release via Rhythm Zone and Avex Music Creative Inc. in five physical editions and for digital consumption. Additionally, it will be their first album without ex-vocalists and performers Chiharu Muto, Kyoka Ichiki and Erie Abe, with singing and disc jockey credits to the latter as a service to her sub-group Dream.

E.G. Crazy works as a concept album, which segregates the discs into two themes; the first being E.G. Pop, and the latter having an E.G. Cool vibe; furthermore, selected tracks represent a new theme Japanese Neo Girls, which executes international cultures through a Japanese woman's perspective. Each disc features 12 tracks, all of which are a mixture of previous singles, cover songs, B-sides and new original recordings. Musically, it is a J-pop collection which incorporates various elements of electronic dance music, and is solely produced by Exile Hiro.

Upon its release, E.G. Crazy received positive reviews from music critics, who praised the idea of a double packaged release, along with its production and sound. Commercially, it experienced success in Japan, reaching the top spot on the Oricon Albums Chart and Billboard charts. In order to promote the record, E-girls conducted a series of live performances, radio and television appearances, and interviews throughout the region. The record also spawned six original singles: "Anniversary!!", "Dance Dance Dance", "Merry x Merry Xmas", "E.G. Summer Rider", "Pink Champagne" and "Go! Go! Let's Go!".

Background and concept
After the release of the girls' third studio album E.G. Time (2014), LDH, the group's management, announced a new line-up system titled the "E-girls Pyramid", which showed each member in the band and their respective sub-groups: Dream, Flower, and Happiness. Six of the twenty-six members were moved out of E-girls and into one of the yet-to-debut groups Rabbits and Bunnies for further training. With this new line-up, E-girls started recording new material for their new album by promoting the single "Anniversary!!" (May 2015). Recording sessions spanned two years, from 2014 to late 2016. After "Anniversary!!", the group released "Dance Dance Dance" as a single, followed by "Merry x Merry Xmas" and "Dance With Me Now!", both of which appeared on the girls' greatest hits album E.G. Smile: E-girls Best (2016). Yuzuna Takebe, who had been moved from E-girls to Rabbits, was added back into E-girls as a performer for these two latter tracks in 2015 and was promoted to a vocalist the following year. The material on E.G. Crazy was recorded by all the vocalists remaining on E-girls: Shizuka, Aya and Ami from Dream, Reina Washio from Flower, and Karen Fujii and Ruri Kawamoto from Happiness.

E.G. Crazy is a double album that incorporates a conceptual approach; certain material is placed into two discs, the first being E.G. Pop and the second having an E.G. Cool vibe. According to the group's management LDH, E.G. Pop promotes the group's "fun", "pop[py]" and "cute" approach while E.G. Cool showcases a more "sexy", "edgy" and "hot" sound. Additionally, E.G. Crazy is the band's first record without vocalist Chiharu Muto and singer/performer Kyoka Ichiki, who left E-girls and their sub-group Flower in October 2014 and 2015, respectively. It is also their first album to not feature Dream member Erie Abe, who announced her retirement from both groups and the entertainment industry in October 2016; Abe sung the album tracks "Boom Boom Christmas" and "Express: Do Your Dance", but was credited through the Dream namesake. Her final appearance with E-girls was during the promotional photoshoot for their single "Go! Go! Let's Go!" (November 2016), and her promise of retirement commenced on December 31 that same year.

Style and songs

The E.G. Post disc opens with the dance rock song "Anniversary!!", while "E.G. Summer Rider" is influenced by dance and pop music. "Saturday Night (Rock na Yoru ni Mahou wo Kakete)", the B-side to the latter recording, was listed at number three, and new song "Harajuku Time Bomb" was described as a blend of punk rock and electronic music. The numbers "White Angel" and "Merry x Merry Xmas" are Christmas songs; the former is a pop ballad that serves as the coupling song to the latter, which was noted for its "fashionable" twist to traditional Christmas music. "Party in the Sun" is the second B-side to "E.G. Summer Rider" and is another dance anthem in the record.

The second new recording is "Fascination", which was described by LDH as a "stylish" and "catchy" disco anthem. "Kikai Shikake no Bye Bye!", the third and final coupling song to appear from "E.G. Summer Rider", was conceived of as a dance-pop track. "Strawberry Sadistic", a pre-recorded song from mid-2015, focuses on rock instrumentation such as electric guitars and synthesizers. "Shukko Sa! (Sail Out For Someone)", which was originally placed as a new recording to E.G. Smile: E-girls Best, is a low-tempo anthem about friendship and love. The disc's closing number is "Love, Dream and Happiness", which is a cover originally performed by Japanese boy band and E-girls brother act, Exile.

On E.G. Cool, it opens with the uptempo "All Day Long Lady", which is one of the new numbers to E.G. Crazy. The following track, "Pink Champagne", is composed as a dance anthem that is inspired by a variety of electronic dance genres, such as tropical house and 1980s disco. "Hey! You!" is the B-side song of the girls' single "Dance Dance Dance", and is heavily influenced by contemporary EDM. The album's fourth and final new recording, titled "CautioN", was described by the group's management as a pop entry that lyrically discusses trouble relationships with men, and love advice to women. Additionally, the record hosts the third and last Christmas song, named "Boom Boom Christmas"; performed by the Dream members, the composition samples the EDM-fuelled sound of their "Odoru Poponkorin" Uniform dance video. Another Dream-performed song is titled "Express (Do Your Dance)", which is produced as an uptempo club track, and is the final B-side from "Dance Dance Dance", which appears as the follow song. This song samples another uniform dance by the group, namely the "Mr. Snowman" dance.

The "futuristic" and "funk[y]" pop song "Bad Girls" appears as the eighth track, and is the coupling number to "Pink Champagne". After this, the final B-side from the latter single is "Cowgirl Rhapsody", which was described by Japanese magazine CD Journal as a techno composition that had drawn inspiration from French club music. "Dance With Me Now!" is a club-oriented anthem that was stated by the group as one of their most "powerful" and "strong" musical works to date. The final B-side track to the record is "Bon Voyage", which appeared on the single "Go! Go! Let's Go"; the former track is composed as a midtempo tropical song, while the latter was the band's first single to host their "Japanese Neo Tokyo" theme. This latter song discusses the girls meeting new people in the future and was noted for its mixture of hip-hop and rock elements.

Promotion
To promote the album, E-girls performed various tracks on their 2016 E.G. Smile concert tour, which was in support of their greatest hits album E.G. Smile: E-girls Best (2016). The live concert and digifest were added onto the DVD and Blu-ray releases of E.G. Crazy. The girls also conducted a series of radio events in Japan for this. Beginning in the third quarter of 2016, the girls would sometimes make appearances, either alone or in small groups, to promote the album. Several dates were also confirmed via the group's management for early-to-mid 2017. Additionally, the band made several television appearances throughout mid-2016 to the end of the year, in shows such as Music Station, MBS' Music Festival and MTV. E-girls have scheduled numerous TV performances through Japan in early 2017, with the first date being a live broadcast of their 2015 Colorful World tour on MTV. To commemorate the records premiere on January 18, Japanese retail store Samantha Vega re-decorated their stores in Shibuya, Tokyo with handbags and other accessories that were in previous partnership with the band, and included each format of E.G. Crazy in their shops; members Harumi Sato, Kaede, and sisters Karen and Shuuka Fujii attended its opening.

Singles
Six singles were released from E.G. Crazy, the first being "Anniversary!!", which was released on May 20, 2015, and came from the E.G. Pop disc respectively. A critical and commercial success, an accompanying music video was issued on Avex Trax's YouTube channel featuring the girls on vacation near a beach side. "Dance Dance Dance" was released on September 30 and was met with positive reviews and moderate success on the Japanese Oricon Singles Chart. A visual was issued on Avex's YouTube channel, having the girls at a night club and wearing Casino-like fashion. The final release was "Merry x Merry Xmas", which premiered on December 23 as a physical and digital single. Appreciated by critics and a moderate success, an accompanying music video had the group performing in a large room filled with Christmas ornaments and decorations.

"E.G. Summer Rider" was released on July 20, 2016 in both physical and digital formats. It is the first release since Kyoka Ichiki departure in October 2015, respectively. It was a critical and commercial success, reaching number three and number two on the daily and weekly Oricon Singles Chart. Furthermore, it peaked at number two on the Japan Hot 100 chart, published by Billboard. An accompanying music video was published a month earlier on YouTube, depicting the girls driving throughout a sunny beach side. The second single, "Pink Champagne", was announced alongside the former single but premiered on August 10 in physical and digital formats.

Serving as the second single from E.G. Cool, "Pink Champagne" was a critical and commercial success, peaking at number two on both the Oricon chart and Japan Hot 100. A music video was released in July that year, showing the girls in various club-oriented locations. The album's third single was "Go! Go! Let's Go", which was distributed on November 11, and served as the final offering from E.G. Cool. It was a critical success, but performed moderately on the Oricon chart, reaching number two but sold achieved lesser sales. The accompanying visual promoted the girls in various Japanese-influenced fashion, and served as the first single to visualize the Japanese Neo Girls theme.

Other songs
"Dance With Me Now!", a promotional recording from E.G. Smile: E-girls Best (2016), was a commercial success on the Billboard charts and received an additional music video; this was Erie Abe's final work with the band. The song "Strawberry Sadistic", which appeared on E.G. Pop, was originally a promotional track to the 2016 Japanese film High & Low: The Movie, which was co-produced by the management of E-girl's, LDH. Despite this, it made an appearance on the accompanying soundtrack and eventually was listed at number ten on E.G. Crazy. The two new tracks from the studio record: "All Day Long Lady" and "Harajuku Time Bomb", were distributed on the Avex YouTube channel. The former song received a music video that depicted the girls as office workers; this was their second visual to incorporate the Japanese Neo Girls theme, where it showed a "melancholy" story of a Monday morning and finished off with a happy weekend. Additionally, a short visual of "Harajuku Time Bomb" interrupted the middle of "All Day Long Lady" as a dream sequence; it featured the girls on a runway with a pink backdrop, singing the song with falling confetti.

Release
E.G. Crazy premiered through AWA Streaming Services on January 3, 2017. Additionally, the album was released on January 18, 2017 via Rhythm Zone and Avex Music Creative Inc. in five physical editions and for digital consumption. All formats included the 24 tracks, but halved into two discs. The bonus DVD and Blu-ray packaging comes with the music videos from their single "Anniversary!!" to "All Day Long Lady". Furthermore, a triple DVD/Blu-ray package featured the music videos on one disc, a second DVD including live performances from their 2016 E.G. Smile tour at Saitama Super Arena, and an encore section of the tour and bonus documentary film on the third. The packaging for E.G. Crazy was photographed by Hirohisa Nakano, and features the members circulated around three large neon-lit circles at random; members Shizuka, Aya, Ami, Kaede, Karen and Shuuka Fujii, Reina Washio and Harumi Sato are all situated in front of the set instead of around the circles.

According to the group's leader Aya, the placement of each member around the shapes emphasize a "vortex" of both "enthusiasm" and "crazy" feelings, two traits that were "expressed" for the record's release, the photo shoot, and subsequently the inspiration towards the title. Additionally, she believed that the material on the record expressed a variety of "crazy" and "frenzy" appeals to Japanese culture, and encouraged both Japanese and international audiences to listen to it. The 2CD, and DVD/Blu-ray editions are packaged in a double-disc jewelcase, which features two flyers and an obi. As for the triple DVD/blu-ray sets, they come in a large box packaging; the music discs are placed in a thin DVD casing, while the live releases are in more thicker cases. In addition to the first-press pre-orders, Rhythm Zone published limited edition photo albums that come with 120 pages of the album's photo shoot, and shots from their E.G. Smile concert tour.

Reception
According to Nielsen SoundScan Japan, E.G. Crazy sold over an estimated 61,000 units between January 16 and 18, effectively their fastest-selling record and nearly doubled the results of Hubby Groove by Inaba / Salas, which scored second place with 37,000 sales. Nevertheless, it experienced success in Japan. It debuted at number one on the daily Oricon Albums Chart with 45,088 copies, making it their highest sales for a studio album, and continuing the band's chart-topping streak. It stayed in the same position the next day with sales of 21,388 copies. However, eight days later, it slipped to number 14. Based on its eight-day availability, E.G. Crazy became the band's fourth studio album to top the weekly Oricon chart. Additionally, it shifted over 93,000 units, marking it their highest-first week sales for a studio release since Colorful Pop (2014), which sold over 89,000 copies. Subsequently, the record opened at number six on the Oricon Digital Chart with 1,624 downloads.

Moreover, E.G. Crazy entered the top spot of the Hot Albums and Sales chart, published by Billboard, with 89,475 copies in its first week. This became the band's fourth consecutive record to top the chart, and exceeded Hubby Groove by Inaba / Salas with over 30,000 units. According to Billboard executives, the record was the highest-selling album based on physical consumption, the sixth highest in digital sales, and was the eighth most searched album that week, effectively giving it the lead position through all formats. However, they predicted that sales through all formats would "settle down" for the following week.

Track listing

Formats
Packaging
2CD — A double album that consists of 12 recordings on two discs in a plastic jewelcase. Includes promotional flyers and an obi.
2CD and DVD/Blu-ray — A double album that consists of 12 recordings on two discs in a plastic jewelcase. Includes a bonus disc with footage of each single's music video. Includes promotional flyers and an obi.
2CD and 3DVD/Blu-ray — A double album that consists of 12 recordings on two discs in a plastic jewelcase. Includes a bonus disc with footage of each single's music video, and two additional discs with scenes from their E.G. Smile concert tour in Saitama, Japan. Includes promotional flyers and an obi, while first-press editions feature a 120-photo book.
Digital download — A double album that consists of 24 recordings, separated in two 1–to–12 listings.

Bonus material
E-girls fan-club editions — Fan editions for the triple DVD/blu-ray bundle comes with Suma Pura packaging—the ability to access the content on different electronic devices—along with neck strap and signed poster. DVD bundles come with the same items but replaces the neck strap with a printed fabric with E-girls.
CDJapan edition — Pre-ordered first-press editions formats feature a B2-size calendar poster.
Tower Records edition — Pre-ordered first-press editions formats feature a special Tower Records poster of the girls. A separate poster was issued in their monthly magazine.
Tsutaya Records first-press — Pre-ordered first-press editions formats feature a special calendar card of the girls, with Tsutaya Records printed on it.

Personnel
Credits adapted from the CD liner notes of E.G. Crazy.

Vocalists

Shizuka – vocals, background vocals
Aya – vocals, background vocals, leader
Ami – vocals, background vocals
Erie Abe – vocals, background vocals (
Karen Fujii – vocals, background vocals (
Ruri Kawamoto – vocals, background vocals (
Reina Washio – vocals, background vocals (
Yuzuna Takabe – vocals, background vocals (

Performers

Sayaka – performer
Kaede – performer
Karen Fujii – performer
Miyuu – performer
Yurino – performer
Anna Suda – performer
Shuuka Fujii – performer
Manami Shigetome – performer
Mio Nakajima – performer
Nozomi Bando – performer
Harumi Sato – performer
Yuzuna Takabe – performer
Anna Ishii – performer
Nonoka Yamaguchi – performer
Erie Abe – performer, disc jockey

Charts and sales

Japanese charts

Sales

|-
! scope="row"| Japan (RIAJ)
| 
| 93,165 
|-
! scope="row"| Japan (RIAJ)
| 
| 1,624 
|-
|}

Release history

Notes

References

External links
Special page for E.G Crazy at E-girls official website. 

2017 albums
E-girls albums
Japanese-language albums
Rhythm Zone albums